"Be-Bop-a-Lula" is a rockabilly song first recorded in 1956 by Gene Vincent and His Blue Caps.

Origins of the song
The writing of the song is credited to Gene Vincent and his manager, Bill "Sheriff Tex" Davis. Evidently the song originated in 1955, when Vincent was recuperating from a motorcycle accident at the US Naval Hospital in Portsmouth, Virginia. There, he met Donald Graves, who supposedly wrote the words to the song while Vincent wrote the tune. The song came to the attention of Davis, who allegedly bought out Graves' rights to the song for some $50 (sources vary as to the exact amount), and had himself credited as the lyric writer. Davis claimed that he wrote the song with Gene Vincent after listening to the song "Don't Bring Lulu". Vincent himself sometimes claimed that he wrote the words inspired by the comic strip, "Little Lulu": "I come in dead drunk and stumble over the bed. And me and Don Graves were looking at this bloody book; it was called Little Lulu. And I said, "Hell, man, it's 'Be-Bop-a-Lulu.' And he said, 'Yeah, man, swinging.' And we wrote this song."

The phrase "Be-Bop-a-Lula" is similar to "Be-Baba-Leba", the title of a No. 3 R&B chart hit for Helen Humes in 1945, which became a bigger hit when recorded by Lionel Hampton as "Hey! Ba-Ba-Re-Bop." This phrase, or something very similar, was widely used in jazz circles in the 1940s, giving its name to the bebop style, and possibly being ultimately derived from the shout of "Arriba! Arriba!" used by Latin American bandleaders to encourage band members.<ref>Peter Gammond, The Oxford Companion to Popular Music, 1991, </ref>

Recording by Gene Vincent
In early 1956, Gene Vincent performed the song on a radio show in Norfolk, Virginia, and recorded a demo version which was passed to Capitol Records, who were looking for a young singer to rival Elvis Presley. Capitol invited Vincent to record the song and it was recorded at Owen Bradley's studio in Nashville, Tennessee on May 4, 1956. Cliff Gallup (lead guitar), "Wee" Willie Williams (rhythm guitar), "Jumpin'" Jack Neal (string bass), and Dickie "Be Bop" Harrell (drums) comprised the band. When the song was being recorded, Harrell screamed twice in the background, he said because he wanted to be sure his mother could hear it was him on the record.

The song was released in June 1956 on Capitol Records' single F3450, and immediately sold well. The song was successful on three American singles charts: it peaked at No. 7 on the US Billboard pop music chart, No. 8 on the R&B chart, and also made the top ten on the C&W Best Seller chart peaking at No. 5. In the UK, it peaked at No. 16 in August 1956.  In April 1957, the record company announced that over 2 million copies had been sold to date.

The original demo for the song, probably recorded at radio station WCMS, has never been located and is presumed lost. The song drew comparisons to Presley and is listed as No. 103 on Rolling Stone's 500 Greatest Songs of All Time.

Steve Allen mocked the lyrics to the song by reading them in a pseudo-serious tone accompanied by light piano background music in a September 1957 broadcast of The Steve Allen Show.

Vincent recorded a new version of the song in 1962 which appeared on the flip-side of the single "The King of Fools".

Vincent is featured singing the song in the movie The Girl Can't Help It which was released in December 1956.

Cover versions
"Be-Bop-a-Lula" has been covered by numerous and varied artists. The Everly Brothers released a version only two years after Vincent's, on their 1958 self-titled debut album, and they included it as part of the setlist at their Royal Albert Hall reunion concert in 1983. English rock band The Drifters covered the song for Cliff Richard and the group’s own debut album, Cliff, in 1959. Vincent's rockabilly colleague Jerry Lee Lewis recorded it for the 1971 album Monsters, and Carl Perkins offered his own take in 1996 on the album The Man & The Legend.

The Beatles played the song regularly during their early years, and a raucous live version (complete with guest vocals) can be heard on Live! at the Star-Club in Hamburg, Germany; 1962. John Lennon later recorded the song for his 1975 album Rock 'n' Roll, and it was used as the B-side for the Apple single release of "Ya Ya" in Germany later that year. Paul McCartney performed an acoustic version on the 1991 live album Unplugged (The Official Bootleg).

The song has also been recorded by:
Alan Vega
Billy Thorpe & the Aztecs
Boney M.
Burton Cummings
David Cassidy
Demented Are Go
Eddy Mitchell
Foghat
Gene Summers
John Lennon
Karel Gott
 Link Wray
Orion
Queen
Raul Seixas
Stray Cats
Suicide
The 77s
 The Spotnicks

In popular culture
Vincent's original version of the song is featured in the soundtracks of several films including The Girl Can't Help It (1956), in which Vincent and several other early rock 'n' roll stars appeared in cameo performances, as well as The Delinquents (1989), Wild At Heart (1990), and  Pleasantville (1998).

In the late 1960s and early 1970s, George Harrison played a psychedelic Stratocaster called "Rocky", which bore on its face the one-word slogan "Bebopalula". The song is name-checked in the opening of Dire Straits' 1985 hit "Walk of Life" as one of the great "oldies, goldies".

Italian DJ and TV personality Red Ronnie (a.k.a. Gabriele Anzaloni) named his first and long-running TV show after the song, also using Vincent's performance in the film The Girl Can't Help It as the signature tune of the show (accompanied by cartoonist Bonvi's Sturmtruppen-inspired animations).

The song features in the soundtrack of Jack Smith's infamous avant-garde film, Flaming Creatures (1963).

A cover version of the song by Chris Cawte appears in the animated film Planet 51.''

References

1956 songs
1956 debut singles
Gene Vincent songs
The Beatles songs
Carl Perkins songs
The Everly Brothers songs
Foghat songs
Gene Summers songs
Jerry Lee Lewis songs
John Lennon songs
Paul McCartney songs
Queen (band) songs
Eric Burdon songs
Grammy Hall of Fame Award recipients
Capitol Records singles